Zhang Zhiqiang may refer to:
 Zhang Zhiqiang (rugby union)
 Zhang Zhiqiang (speed skater)